The grievance studies affair, also referred to as the "Sokal Squared" scandal, was the project of a team of three authors—Peter Boghossian, James A. Lindsay, and Helen Pluckrose—to highlight what they saw as poor scholarship and eroding criteria in several academic fields. Taking place over 2017 and 2018, their project entailed submitting bogus papers to academic journals in cultural, queer, race, gender, fat, and sexuality studies to determine whether they would pass through peer review and be accepted for publication.  Several of these papers were subsequently published, which the authors cited in support of their contention.

Prior to the affair, concerns about the intellectual validity of much research influenced by postmodern philosophy and critical theory were highlighted by various academics who composed nonsensical hoax articles parodying the language and content of much research in the modern humanities and succeeded in having these articles accepted for publication in academic journals. One of the most noted previous examples of this was Alan Sokal's 1996 hoax in Social Text, a cultural studies journal, which inspired Boghossian, Lindsay, and Pluckrose. The trio set out with the intent to expose problems in what they called "grievance studies", referring to academic areas where they claim "a culture has developed in which only certain conclusions are allowed… and put social grievances ahead of objective truth". As such, the trio, identifying themselves as leftists and liberals, described their project as an attempt to raise awareness of what they believed was the damage that postmodernism and identity politics-based scholarship was having on leftist political projects, but mainly Science and Academia.

Boghossian, Lindsay, and Pluckrose wrote 20 articles that promoted deliberately absurd ideas or morally questionable acts and submitted them to various peer-reviewed journals. Although they had planned for the project to run until January 2019, the trio admitted to the hoax in October 2018 after journalists from The Wall Street Journal revealed that "Helen Wilson", the pseudonym used for their article published in Gender, Place & Culture, did not exist. By the time of the revelation, 4 of their 20 papers had been published; 3 had been accepted but not yet published; 6 had been rejected; and 7 were still under review. Included among the articles that were published were arguments that dogs engage in rape culture and that men could reduce their transphobia by anally penetrating themselves with sex toys, as well as Adolf Hitler's Mein Kampf rewritten in feminist language. The first of these had won special recognition from the journal that published it.

The hoax received a polarized reception within academia. Some academics praised it for exposing flaws that they saw as widespread among sectors of the humanities and social sciences influenced by postmodernism, critical theory, and identity politics. Others criticised what they perceived as the unethical nature of submitting deliberately bogus research. Some critics also asserted that the work did not represent a scientific investigation, given that the project did not include a control group, further arguing that invalid arguments and poor standards of peer-review were not restricted to "grievance studies" subjects but found across much of academia.

"Grievance studies" and "applied postmodernism" 
Through their series of hoax articles, James A. Lindsay, Peter Boghossian, and Helen Pluckrose intended to expose issues in what they term as "grievance studies", a subcategory of academic areas where the three believe "a culture has developed in which only certain conclusions are allowed ... and put social grievances ahead of objective truth". The trio referred to several academic fields—postcolonial theory, gender studies, queer theory, critical race theory, intersectional feminism, and fat studies—as "grievance studies" because, according to Pluckrose, such areas begin "from the assumption of a grievance" and then bend "the available theories to confirm it". Pluckrose argued that all of these fields derive their underlying theoretical perspectives from the postmodern philosophy that developed in the late 1960s. Focusing on the work of French postmodern philosopher Michel Foucault, she highlighted how he argued that knowledge and power were interwoven and emphasised the role of discourse in society.

Pluckrose suggested that fields such as postcolonial theory and queer theory could be called "applied postmodernism" in that they sprung up largely in the late 1980s as a means of pushing the gains of the civil rights movement, gay rights movement, and liberal feminism from the arena of legislative change and into the territory of changing discourse. She argued that these fields adapted postmodernism to suit their activist agendas. From postmodernism, they adopted the idea that knowledge is a social construct, but at the same time they held to the modernist view that "no progress could be made unless some things were objectively true". Thus, the "applied postmodernists", Pluckrose argued, insisted that "systems of power and privilege that oppressed women, people of colour and the LGBT" are objectively real and could be revealed by analysing discourses. At the same time, she argued, they retained postmodernism's scepticism toward science and objective knowledge, its view of "society as a system of power and privilege" and "commitment to the belief that all imbalances are socially constructed", rather than arising from biological reality.

Pluckrose described herself and her collaborators as being "left-wing liberal sceptics". She stated that a core reason for why they wanted to carry out the project was to convince other "leftist academics" that there was a problem with "corrupted scholarship" in academic fields that were "based on identity politics and postmodernism." She argued that in rejecting modernism, much postmodernist-derived scholarship was also rejecting science, reason, and liberal democracy, and thus undermining many important progressive gains. Pluckrose also expressed concern that, in both foregrounding the importance of group identity and facilitating the growth of post-truth by claiming that there is no objective truth, this postmodernist theory was contributing to "the reactionary surge to the right" seen in many countries during the 2010s.

In 2020, Pluckrose and Lindsay further investigated the effects of critical theory in their book Cynical Theories: How Universities Made Everything About Race, Gender, and Identity—and Why This Harms Everybody.

Sequence of events 
By the time of the reveal, 7 of their 20 papers had been accepted for publication, 7 were still under review, and 6 had been rejected. Included among the articles that were published were arguments that dogs engage in rape culture and that men could reduce their transphobia by anally penetrating themselves with sex toys, as well as Adolf Hitler's Mein Kampf rewritten in feminist language. One of the published papers in particular had won special recognition from the journal that published it.

Attempts 
Prior to the affair, expressing concerns about the intellectual validity of much research influenced by postmodern philosophy and critical theory, various academics highlighted this by publishing hoax articles in various journals. It was the 1996 hoax by Alan Sokal in Social Text, in particular, that influenced James A. Lindsay and Peter Boghossian to publish a hoax article of their own.

On May 19, 2017, peer-reviewed journal Cogent Social Sciences published "The conceptual penis as a social construct", which argued that penises are not "male"; rather, they should be analyzed as social constructs instead. The same day, Lindsay and Boghossian revealed it to be a hoax aimed at discrediting gender studies, although Cogent Social Sciences is not exclusively a gender-studies journal. While the journal did conduct a postmortem, both authors concluded the "impact [of the hoax] was very limited, and much criticism of it was legitimate".

The authors claim to have started their second attempt on August 16, 2017, with Helen Pluckrose joining them in September. The new methodology called for the submission of multiple papers, each of which would be submitted to "higher-ranked journals"; if it were rejected, feedback from the peer-review process was used to revise the paper before it was submitted to a lower-ranked journal. This process was repeated until the paper was accepted, or until the three authors gave up on that paper. The authorship of each paper was either fictional—such as "Helen Wilson" of "Portland Ungendering Research Initiative"—or real people willing to lend their name, such as Richard Baldwin, professor emeritus of history at Gulf Coast State College.

Over the course of the project, 20 papers were submitted and 48 "new submissions" of those papers were made. The first acceptance, "Human Reactions to Rape Culture and Queer Performativity at the Dog Park", was achieved five months after the project began. During the initial peer review for its second, and ultimately successful, attempt at publication in Gender, Place & Culture, what the hoaxers called the "Dog Park" paper was praised by the first reviewer as "incredibly innovative, rich in analysis, and extremely well-written and organized". Similar respectful feedback was provided for other accepted papers.

Discovery of hoax 
The project was intended to run until January 31, 2019, but came to a premature end. On June 7, 2018, the Twitter account "New Real Peer Review" discovered one of their papers. This brought it to the attention of reporters at The College Fix, Reason, and other news outlets who began trying to contact the fictional author and journal it was published in. The journal Gender, Place & Culture published a note on August 6, 2018, stating that it suspected "Helen Wilson" had breached their contract to "not [fabricate] or [misappropriate] anyone's identity, including [their] own", adding that "the author has not responded to our request to provide appropriate documentation confirming their identity". According to the trio, another journal and a reporter at The Wall Street Journal were also asking for proof of identity at this point, and that it was the right time to go public; they admitted the hoax to the journalist in early August.

When The Wall Street Journal report went public on October 2, the trio released an essay describing their project, as well as a Google Drive archive of most of their papers and email correspondence which included reviewer comments. Simultaneously, filmmaker Mike Nayna released a video on YouTube revealing the story behind the project. , Nayna and producer Mark Conway were working on a documentary film about the project.

Reactions 

The project drew both praise and criticism. The science writer Tom Chivers suggested that the result was a "predictable furore", whereby those already sceptical of gender studies hailed it as evidence for "how the whole field is riddled with nonsense", while those sympathetic to gender studies thought it was "dishonestly undermining good scholarship."

The political scientist Yascha Mounk dubbed it "Sokal squared" in reference to the Sokal affair hoax accomplished by Alan Sokal, and said that the "result is hilarious and delightful. It also showcases a serious problem with big parts of academia." The psychologist Steven Pinker said the project posed the question "is there any idea so outlandish that it won't be published in a Critical/PoMo/Identity/'Theory' journal?" In contrast, Joel P. Christensen and Matthew A. Sears, both classicists, referred to it as "the academic equivalent of the fraudulent hit pieces on Planned Parenthood" produced in 2015, more interested in publicity than valid argumentation.

In The Atlantic, Mounk said that "Like just about everything else in this depressing national moment, Sokal Squared is already being used as ammunition in the great American culture war." He characterized two sets of responses to the affair as "intellectually dishonest": right-wing responses that used the affair to discredit wider academia and left-wing responses that treated it as a politically motivated attack on academia. He said the former overlooked that "There are many fields of academia that have absolutely no patience for nonsense", including the fact that all the papers submitted to sociology journals had been rejected, while the latter attacked the motives behind the hoax instead of refuting it.

Responses by the editors of the publishing journals 
Ann Garry, a co-editor of Hypatia, which had accepted one of the hoax papers ("When the Joke's on You", which purported to be a feminist critique of hoaxes) but had not published it yet, said she was "deeply disappointed" by the hoax. Garry told The New York Times that "Referees put in a great deal of time and effort to write meaningful reviews, and the idea that individuals would submit fraudulent academic material violates many ethical and academic norms." Nicholas Mazza, editor of the Journal of Poetry Therapy, said: "Although a valuable point was learned regarding the authenticity of articles/authors… the authors of the 'study' clearly engaged in flawed and unethical research."

Praise 
Yascha Mounk of Johns Hopkins University said that while the authors received no favors for preparing the hoax, they demonstrated mastery in postmodern jargon and not only ridiculed the journals in question, but, more importantly, outed double standards of gender studies which happily welcome hoaxes against "morally suspect" fields like economics, but are unable to accept a criticism of their own methods. He also noted the "sheer amount of tribal solidarity it has elicited among leftists and academics" and the fact that many of the reactions were purely ad hominem, while few have actually noted that there is an actual problem highlighted by the hoax: "some of the leading journals in areas like gender studies have failed to distinguish between real scholarship and intellectually vacuous as well as morally troubling bullshit". Mounk also countered criticism that the trio received about the lack of controls as a "confused attempt to import statistics into a question where it doesn't apply".

Justin E. H. Smith defended hoaxing as an intellectual or scholarly practice, providing a series of examples of hoaxes ranging from the Italian Renaissance to the 2000s. In The Chronicle of Higher Education, Heather E. Heying pointed out that the hoax helped to expose many pathologies of the modern social sciences, such as "repudiation of science and logic" and "extolling activism over inquiry".

Upon Boghossian's employer Portland State University initiating a research misconduct inquiry on the grounds of conducting human subject-based research without approval, and further considering a charge of fabricating data, a number of prominent academics submitted letters of support to him and defended the motive of the hoax, including Steven Pinker and various Portland State students. Richard Dawkins compared Boghossian to a novelist, pointing out that George Orwell's novel Animal Farm could be criticized for its many "falsehoods" regarding the capabilities of animals to speak English. He asked:

The psychologist Jonathan Haidt stated that the inquiry would be "a profound moral error—an injustice—that will be obvious to all who hear about your decision, and that will have bad effects upon the public perception of PSU and of universities in general", and concluded that Boghossian and his co-authors are whistleblowers, who undertook a "career-risking project to stand up for academic integrity by exposing what is, arguably, an academic subculture that tolerates intellectual fraud." Philosopher Daniel Dennett stated that Boghossian's targets "could learn a few things about academic integrity" from his "fine example", undertaken "in good faith". Alan Sokal and Jordan Peterson also supported Boghossian.

The World Socialist Web Site Eric London said the hoax was "a well-timed blow" against the "identity politics industry" and postmodernism.

Criticism 
Writing for Slate, Daniel Engber criticized the project, saying that "one could have run this sting on almost any empirical discipline and returned the same result". Similarly, Sarah Richardson, Harvard University professor of women's studies, criticized the hoaxers for not including a control group in their experiment, telling BuzzFeed News: "By their own standards, we can't scientifically conclude anything from it." n+1 magazine published a critical article that cited a survey by the science writer Jim Schnabel of similar hoax attempts, summarizing Schnabel's conclusion as "the educated public makes a decision based not on the scientific merits of the hoax but on the relative orthodoxy of the hoaxer and hoaxee. In effect, the result of the trick is decided in advance by the power relations of the field." The article goes on to assert that the relative orthodoxy in this case was "not an orthodoxy of scientific legitimacy but rather the emerging consensus of tech bros, Davos billionaires, and alt-right misogynists".

In UnHerd, Chivers noted that while the so-called "grievance studies" fields "probably" contain more "bullshit… than most scientific fields", the project distracted attention from problems of shoddy scholarship across the entirety of academia. He highlighted that several weeks prior to the project's public revelation, professor of food behaviour Brian Wansink had resigned from his position at Cornell University following exposure of instances of scientific misconduct on his part.

Carl T. Bergstrom, writing in The Chronicle of Higher Education, says: "the hoaxers appear woefully naïve about how the system actually works". Peer review is not designed to remove fraud or even absurd ideas, he claimed, and replication will lead to self-correction. In the same article, David Schieber said he was one of the two anonymous reviewers for "Rubbing One Out", and argued that the hoaxers selectively quoted from his review. "They were turning my attempt to help the authors of a rejected paper into an indictment of my field and the journal I reviewed for, even though we rejected the paper."

Ten professors at Portland State University signed an open letter saying the hoax was not comparable to the Sokal affair, the latter taking place during "a time of debate and exploration in the field of philosophy and science", and that the trio were only exploiting "credulous journalists interested mainly in spectacle" to conduct academic fraud. They compared the trio's style to "Trumpist politics" and wrote that "[d]esperate reasoning, basic spite and a perverse interest in public humiliation seem to have overridden any actual scholarly goals." The authors asked to remain anonymous, alleging Boghossian had targeted academics at other institutions and that they would likely receive "threats of death and assault from online trolls".

Tim Smith-Laing reviewed Cynical Theories in The Daily Telegraph, a conservative newspaper. Referring to the "rape culture in dog parks" paper, Smith-Laing stated that "science writer Tom Chivers, among others, noted, it is invidious to claim that there is a particular problem with humanities and social sciences journals in the midst of the ongoing replication crisis in scientific journals. Indeed, it is impossible to do so at all if your experiment does not compare the two. More simply, and more fatally, it is not quite logical to assert that your hoax shows a widespread disregard for empirical proof when the papers published contained quantities of carefully fabricated empirical proof."

In an article in the journal Science, Technology, and Human Values, Mikko Lagerspetz analyzed the project's experimental design and its possible results, based on the peer reviews and editorial decisions available through the project's website. He sums up as follows:

He concludes that the experiment was flawed both experimentally and ethically, and failed to provide the evidence it sought. It is unclear, on what grounds the project group decided what journals to target. One third (7) of the 21 final editorial decisions the authors received were positive, two thirds of the decisions were negative. In the absence of a control group, it is impossible to tell whether this ratio could have been lower or higher within some other disciplines.

List of hoax papers

Accepted

Published 
Following the discovery of the hoax, all four papers were retracted:

Not yet published

Considered

Revise and resubmit

Under review

Rejected

See also 
 List of scholarly publishing stings
 Postmodernism Generator
 Science wars

References

Footnotes

Bibliography

Further reading

External links 

 Grievance studies on Peter Boghossian's webpage
 Collection of the papers, reviews and press material on Google Drive

2017 hoaxes
2018 hoaxes
Academic scandals
Articles containing video clips
Criticism of postmodernism
Hoaxes in science
Scientific misconduct incidents
Sociology of scientific knowledge
Literary forgeries